Pieter ("Piet") Aldrich (born 7 September 1965) is a former professional tennis player from South Africa. A doubles specialist, he won two Grand Slam men's doubles titles (Australian Open and US Open) and became the world No. 1 in doubles in 1990.

Career
Aldrich won the first of nine career doubles titles in 1988 at Charleston, South Carolina.

In 1990, Aldrich won the men's doubles titles at both the Australian Open and the US Open, partnering his fellow South African player Danie Visser. The pair were also doubles runners-up at Wimbledon that year.

1990 also saw Aldrich win his first (and only) top-level singles title at Newport, Rhode Island. His career-high ranking in singles was world No. 64, which he achieved in 1988.

Aldrich won the final doubles title of his career in 1992 in Johannesburg.

Grand Slam finals

Doubles (2 wins, 1 loss)

ATP career finals

Singles: 1 (1 title)

Doubles: 19 (9 titles, 10 runner-ups)

ATP Challenger and ITF Futures finals

Singles: 2 (1–1)

Doubles: 2 (2–0)

Performance timelines

Singles

Doubles

Mixed Doubles

References

External links
 
 

South African male tennis players
Tennis players from Johannesburg
1965 births
Living people
Afrikaner people
Grand Slam (tennis) champions in men's doubles
Australian Open (tennis) champions
US Open (tennis) champions
ATP number 1 ranked doubles tennis players